The 1998 Hurricane Georges tornado outbreak was a six-day tornado outbreak associated with the passage of Hurricane Georges in the Southeast United States. Most of the tornadoes produced by the storm formed in the outer bands of the storm and were relatively weak; however, one F2 tornado touched down in Florida. The outbreak produced 47 tornadoes—20 in Alabama, 17 in Florida and 10 in Georgia—and was the most extensive tornado event in Florida history, with touchdowns reported the entire length of the state.

Synopsis

On September 22, as Hurricane Georges was still over Hispaniola, the National Hurricane Center warned that there was the possibility of isolated tornadoes in the outer bands of the storm. The first tornado, rated F0 touched down in Miami-Dade County around 8:08 am EDT on September 24. A second F0 touched down roughly an hour later in the county. The first tornado watch associated with the hurricane was issued at 6:00 am EDT on September 25 for south-central Florida and remained in effect for 24 hours. Over the following three days, a tornado watch was constantly in effect for some part of Florida as Georges slowly moved parallel to the state. During the afternoon of September 25, a new watch was issued to encompass Sarasota and Manatee counties. By September 26, nearly every county south Marion County had been placed under a tornado watch.

As Georges was not forecast to impact the coastline of Georgia, the National Hurricane Center did not issue any tropical storm watches or warnings; however after weakening to a tropical storm, the system tracked through the state, prompting the National Weather Service to issue tornado watches and tornado Warnings for parts of the region. Due to the slow motion of the storm, the Hydrometeorological Prediction Center (HPC) issued flash flood watches for central and southwestern portions of the state on September 29. The first tornado watch in the state associated with Georges was issued for the same areas. The next day, the flash flood watch was expanded to include all areas of the state except the northwest region.

Confirmed tornadoes

September 24 event

September 25 event

September 26 event
On September 26, Hurricane Georges produced no known tornadoes as it moved away from the Florida coastline and into the open waters of the Gulf of Mexico.

September 27 event

September 28 event

September 29 event

September 30 event

See also 

 Hurricane Georges
 List of tornadoes and tornado outbreaks
 List of North American tornadoes and tornado outbreaks
 List of tropical cyclone-spawned tornadoes

References

External links
National Climatic Data Center Storm Events Database
The National Hurricane Center's Preliminary Report on Hurricane Georges

Hurricane Georges
Tornadoes in Florida
Tornadoes in Alabama
Tornadoes in Georgia (U.S. state)
Tornadoes of 1998
September 1998 events
1998 natural disasters in the United States